Peter Hirsch (born March 6, 1979) is a Danish former professional ice hockey goaltender.

Playing career
After playing three seasons for Modo Hockey in the Swedish Hockey League, Hirsch spent a season with the Bakersfield Condors in the ECHL. During the 2007-08 season he represented AaB Ishockey in the Danish Elite League, where he on previous occasions had played for Rungsted IK and Nordsjælland Cobras.

In 2009 Hirsch joined the British club Coventry Blaze, where he helped the team win the Elite Ice Hockey League title before returning to North America and the Bakersfield Condors the following season. He also played for Pensacola Ice Flyers of the Southern Professional Hockey League during the 2010-11 season.

On April 12, 2011, it was confirmed that Hirsch would return to Coventry Blaze, in the hope that he could help the team claim back the EIHL title.

Hirsch has served as Team Denmark's number-one goaltender in the International Ice Hockey Federation Ice Hockey World Championships.

Career statistics

Regular season & playoffs

International

References

External links
 

1979 births
Living people
AaB Ishockey players
Bakersfield Condors (1998–2015) players
Coventry Blaze players
Danish expatriate sportspeople in Sweden
Danish expatriate sportspeople in England
Danish ice hockey goaltenders
IF Troja/Ljungby players
IK Oskarshamn players
Leksands IF players
Malmö Redhawks players
Modo Hockey players
Sportspeople from Copenhagen
Timrå IK players
Pensacola Ice Flyers players
Danish expatriate sportspeople in the United States